John Faucit Savill or Saville, also known as John Savill(e) Faucit, stage name Mr Faucit, (1783?–1853) was an English actor, playwright and theatre manager. He married Harriet Diddear, later known as Harriet Elizabeth Savill  and as Mrs Faucit. They had six children including the actress Helena Faucit (also known as Helen).

References

1780s births
1853 deaths
English male stage actors
English theatre managers and producers
English dramatists and playwrights
19th-century British businesspeople
19th-century English male actors